Centro Metropolitano is a Federal District Metro brazilian station on Green line. It was opened for full service on 23 April 2007 as part of the section between Praça do Relógio and Ceilândia Sul, though the shuttle service at this section started in November 2006. The station is located between Praça do Relógio and Ceilândia Sul.

References

Brasília Metro stations
2007 establishments in Brazil
Railway stations opened in 2007